Emily Sweeney may refer to:

Emily Sweeney (The Big Bang Theory)
Emily Sweeney (luger)